Zara Investment Holding Co Ltd. was founded on 10 May 1994 by Sabih al-Masri, the current chairman, and Khalil Talhouni, in addition to a number of investors and local banks and Arab and international investment companies, such as the International Finance Corporation (IFC).

Zara invests primarily in tourism; particularly, in the hotels sector. Zara is one of the largest investment groups in Jordan.

Zara owns the most 5-star hotels in Jordan, with seven, including: Dead Sea, Petra and Amman. The number of hotel rooms owned by Zara Investment is 2131; which equals 30% of the total of 5-star hotel rooms in Jordan, and 26% of the workforce.

See also
 Mövenpick Hotels & Resorts
 Movenpick Dead Sea Spa and Resort
 Intercontinental Jordan Hotel
 Mövenpick Resort Petra

References

Gallery

Holding companies of Jordan
Hospitality companies of Jordan
Companies listed on the Amman Stock Exchange